Broager Church (Broager Kirke) is a church in the locality of Broager, Denmark.

History
The original construction dates from about 1209. The chapel and vestry are Gothic-style and the whole church is built of bricks. The churchyard has the tallest wooden bell tower in Denmark, which dates back to 1650.

The church itself is decorated with murals from various periods.
Restoration of the church in 1924-27 revealed frescoes from different periods; Romanesque from the beginning of the 13th century, late-Gothic from about 1500 and Renaissance paintings from 1587. The chapel's murals  depict the legend of Saint George and the Dragon, and his martyrdom. These pictures, together with the late medieval carved wooden figure of the dragon slayer from app. 1490  formed the setting for the chapel's Saint George cult. In the late 1990s,  restoration was done in collaboration with the architects Hans Lund and  Alan Havsteen-Mikkelsen (1938–2002).

The altarpiece was made by Dutch artist Anthon Günther Lundt and dating from 1717. The style is Baroque with acanthus foliage. The pulpit is Renaissance from 1591 made at one of the fine local joiner-workshops in Flensburg. 
The crucifix from approx. 1250 is a mixture type between Late Romanesque and early Gothic.
The baptismal font origins from the first building period of the church together with the communion table.  The font is composed of two types of granite; a reddish basin upon a greyish foot. Upon the foot are four carved male heads, two with pageboy haircuts and no beard and two with center parting and beard. The lid of the font is a wooden crown from 1787. The baptismal  basin  is of brass and dates from the same period.

Gallery

References

Broager
Churches in the diocese of Haderslev
13th-century churches in Denmark